Caroline Dolehide and Maria Sanchez were the defending champions but chose not to participate.

Harriet Dart and Asia Muhammad won the title, defeating Peangtarn Plipuech and Aldila Sutjiadi in the final, 6–3, 2–6, [10–7].

Seeds

Draw

Draw

References

External Links
Main Draw

Dow Tennis Classic - Doubles